Grogan's Mill (officially the Village of Grogan's Mill) is a village of The Woodlands, a planned community in Texas.

Established in 1972, it is the first of ten villages developed in The Woodlands. Its namesake is the Grogan-Cochran Lumber Company, the last sawmill to operate in the area. It consists of approximately 5,100 homes and 13,000 residents in 22 neighborhoods and over 50 businesses. Its most notable amenity is The Woodlands Resort & Conference Center and most notable resident was George P. Mitchell.

History 
Before Spanish Texas, Mexican Texas, and the Republic of Texas, the Grogan's Mill territory was likely inhabited by the Bidai. From the 1850s to 1950s, the territory was closely linked to the history of the timber industry in Montgomery County, which had more sawmills than any other county in East Texas. From 1918 to 1964, the Grogan Cochran Lumber Company operated the final mill in the area before selling 2,800 acres to George Mitchell. Mitchell acquired an additional 14,655 acres over the ensuing years for the development of a planned community called The Woodlands.

Development of Grogan's Mill, the first of ten villages, began in the fall of 1972. The Information Center was finished in 1973 and the Wharf and Conference Center (today as The Woodlands Resort) was finished in late 1974. Growth stalled until 1976 due to the 1970s energy crisis. Development of The Woodlands first estate neighborhoods began in 1980. Initially envisioned as an equestrian community, Grogan's Point became the model for estate neighborhoods later villages would follow.

Governance 
Grogan's Mill Village is administered by the Grogan's Mill Village Association (GMVA), which falls under the governance of The Woodlands Township, a special-purpose district created by the 73rd Texas Legislature in 1993. The Woodlands is not a city nor a traditional township government, however it still provides limited municipal government services such as trash pickup, parks and recreation, covenant enforcement, fire and rescue services, streetscaping, economic development, and enhanced law enforcement and security patrols.

The Grogan's Mill Village Association provides a forum for village-centric civic and social issues and opportunities. All residents over the age of 18 are members of the association who are able to elect its 15 governing officers, whom are governed by the association bylaws.

Committees 
GMVA maintains committees, which are support by a chairman and at least one member, and report to the GMVA board.

Amenities

Commercial 

 Grogan's Mill Village Center
The Woodlands Country Club Oaks Clubhouse
 The Woodlands Resort & Conference Center
 The Woodlands Sports Park
 The Woodlands Swim and Athletic Center (defunct, 1975-2008)
 Training facility of Laura Wilkinson

Parks and Lakes

Major 

 Sawmill Park
 Tamarac Park
 Lake Harrison

Minor 

 Cokeberry Pond Park
 Grogan's Point Park
 High Oaks Park 
 Loggers Hollow Park 
 Maplewood Park 
 Mel Killian Park 
 Millbend Loop Linear Park 
 Pastoral Pond Park 
 Sunset Springs Park

Source:

Neighborhoods 
Grogan's Mill consists of approximately 5,100 homes and 13,000 residents in 22 neighborhoods.

Estate 

 Grogan's Point
 Wilding Estates
Doe Run

High 

 The Enclave at Mill Point
Fairway Oaks
Millbend Forest
Tamarac Woods
 Woodmill Creek

Mid-high 

 Arbor
Avana
 Elm Branch
 High Oaks
Pheasant Run
Sawmill Woods
Settler's Corner
Stonemill Courts
Sunset Springs
Tall Forest
Timber Top
West High Oaks
 Windwood
Woodfarm

Education 

 Hailey Elementary
 Knox Junior High School
 Lamar Elementary
 Paddington British Private School
 Teach-A-Tot Child Development Center
 Wilkerson Intermediate

Notable residents 

Adrian Peterson
George P. Mitchell (founder of The Woodlands)
Lyle Lovett
Robert Marling

See also 
 George P. Mitchell
Grogan's Point
 The Woodlands, TX

References 

Census-designated places in Texas
Villages in Texas
The Woodlands, Texas